Joseph Pennell Elementary School is a historic elementary school in the Belfield neighborhood of Philadelphia, Pennsylvania. It is part of the School District of Philadelphia. The building was designed by architect Irwin T. Catharine and built in 1926–1927. It is a three-story brick building, nine bays wide with projecting end bays in the Late Gothic Revival style. An addition was built in 1954. The school is named for illustrator Joseph Pennell (1857–1926).

The building was added to the National Register of Historic Places in 1988.

References

External links

School buildings on the National Register of Historic Places in Philadelphia
Gothic Revival architecture in Pennsylvania
School buildings completed in 1927
Elementary schools in Philadelphia
School District of Philadelphia
1927 establishments in Pennsylvania